Vallabh Bhatt was a medieval Gujarati poet. Born in Ahmedabad, he later moved to Becharaji in devotion to the goddess Bahuchar Mata. He wrote several Garba and other devotional songs.

Life
Not much is known about his life but his works and folklore are source of information regarding his life. Vallabh was born in Bhatt Mevada Brahmin caste. He was born in Navapura Para of Ahmedabad on Aaso Sud 8 of  Vikram Samvat 1696 or 1700 AD.
He moved from Ahmedabad to Chunval (now Becharaji). The brothers went under Yagnopavit ritual at age of five and were taught by Paramanand Swarup Brahmachari for brief period. He was Vaishnav in his early life but became follower of Shakti later.  He had three brothers; Heri, Dhola and name of third is not known. Hari and Dhola Bhatt were also poets. He wrote his first Garbo, Anandno Garbo on Falgun Sud 3 of Samvat 1709 as described in the Garba, at the age of 13.

He wrote several Garba dedicated to Bahuchar Mata which are still popular across Gujarat. His name along with his brothers are perpetuated in cry of devotees in temple, Vallabh-Dhola Ki Jai or Vallabh-Hari Ki Jai.

He died on Aaso Sud 8 of Samvat 1807.

Legend
In Narmagadya, there is a legend associated with Vallabh Bhatt. It is said that once he visited Nathdwara to worship  Shrinathji. He accidentally spit in temple premises and was scolded by people. He responded that parents don't scold children for spitting in their laps. The priests told that mother may not scold children but fathers may scold. Thus vallabh changed his devotion from male figure Shrinathji to female figure Shakti or Bahuchar Mata thereafter.

Works
Vallabh wrote the first Laavni, a poetry in specific taala, dedicated goddess. He wrote several Garba, Dhal, Pada, aarti songs mostly dedicated to goddess Bahuchar while others are dedicated to religious and epic figures.

Some of them are Anandno Garbo, Krishnavirahna Pada, Chosaath Joganiono Garbo, Bahucharajina Pada, Ramchandrajina Pada, Aarasurno Garbo, Shangarno Garbo, Mahakalino Garbo, Kalikaalno Garbo, Satyabhamano Garbo, Aankhmichamanino Garbo, Kamlakanthna Baar Mahina, Vrajviyog, Kajodano Garbo, Dhanushdharinu Varnan, Ambajina Mahina, Bahucharajini Aarti, Bahucharajini Gagar, Bahucharajino Rang Padasangrah, Rang Aarti, Chhutak Pada, Shrichakrano Garbo, Ambajino Garbo, Ramvivah, Abhimanyuno Chakravo. In Kalikaalno Garbo, he portrayed misery and immorality during famine of Samvat 1788.

Bibliography

See also
 List of Gujarati-language writers

References

Gujarati-language poets
Writers from Ahmedabad
17th-century Indian poets
Indian male poets
Poets from Gujarat
17th-century male writers